The George W. and Sarah Trogner House is located in Neillsville, Wisconsin.

History
The house was designed and built by Civil War veteran, wagon builder, mill owner, and carpenter George W. Trogner for his own family. It was added to the State and the National Register of Historic Places in 2005.

References

Houses on the National Register of Historic Places in Wisconsin
National Register of Historic Places in Clark County, Wisconsin
Houses in Clark County, Wisconsin
Queen Anne architecture in Wisconsin
Houses completed in 1897